Landmark Academy is a charter school (K-12th grade) located in Kimball in southeastern Michigan. The school is chartered by Saginaw Valley State University. The campus consists of two buildings.

In 2010, Landmark completed the purchase of the adjacent Cross Current Megachurch building. The upper floor has been remodeled as of August 2006 into a more classroom-like setting for use as the school's middle/high school building. As of June 2010, the lower floor is also being remodeled for use as classrooms. Beginning in the 2010 school year, the lower floor will be designated as middle school, while the upper floor will be used as a high school.

External links

Charter schools in Michigan
Schools in St. Clair County, Michigan
Public high schools in Michigan
Public middle schools in Michigan
Public elementary schools in Michigan
1999 establishments in Michigan
Educational institutions established in 1999